The Asia/Oceania Zone was the unique zone within Group 4 of the regional Davis Cup competition in 2019. The zone's competition was held in round robin format in Amman, Jordan from 11 to 14 September 2019.

Participating nations

Inactive nations

Draw
Date: 11–14 September

Location: Jordan Tennis Federation, Amman, Jordan (hard)

Format: Round-robin basis.

Seeding

 1Davis Cup Rankings as of 4 February 2019

Round Robin

Pool A

Pool B

Pool C

Pool D

Standings are determined by: 1. number of wins; 2. number of matches; 3. in two-team ties, head-to-head records; 4. in three-team ties, (a) percentage of sets won (head-to-head records if two teams remain tied), then (b) percentage of games won (head-to-head records if two teams remain tied), then (c) Davis Cup rankings.

Playoffs

Round Robin

Pool A

Pacific Oceania vs. Bangladesh

Saudi Arabia vs. Bangladesh

Pacific Oceania vs. Saudi Arabia

Pool B

Oman vs. Iraq

Bahrain vs. Iraq

Oman vs. Bahrain

Pool C

Jordan vs. Turkmenistan

Mongolia vs. Guam

Jordan vs. Mongolia

Turkmenistan vs. Guam

Jordan vs. Guam

Mongolia vs. Turkmenistan

Pool D

United Arab Emirates vs. Tajikistan

Cambodia vs. Kyrgyzstan

United Arab Emirates vs. Kyrgyzstan

Cambodia vs. Tajikistan

United Arab Emirates vs. Cambodia

Tajikistan vs. Kyrgyzstan

Playoffs

1st to 4th playoffs

Pacific Oceania vs. United Arab Emirates

Oman vs. Jordan

5th to 8th playoffs

Saudi Arabia vs. Cambodia

Iraq vs. Turkmenistan

9th to 12th playoffs

Bangladesh vs. Kyrgyzstan

Bahrain vs. Guam

References

External links
Official Website

Asia/Oceania Zone Group IV
Davis Cup Asia/Oceania Zone